Lucas Kozeniesky (born May 31, 1995) is an American sports shooter. He competed in the men's 10 metre air rifle event at the 2016 Summer Olympics. In June 2021, he qualified to represent the United States at the 2020 Summer Olympics and won a silver medal in the Mixed 10m Air Rifle.

References

External links
 

1995 births
Living people
American male sport shooters
Olympic shooters of the United States
Shooters at the 2016 Summer Olympics
ISSF rifle shooters
People from Metairie, Louisiana
Pan American Games medalists in shooting
Pan American Games gold medalists for the United States
Pan American Games silver medalists for the United States
Shooters at the 2019 Pan American Games
Medalists at the 2019 Pan American Games
Shooters at the 2020 Summer Olympics
Olympic silver medalists for the United States in shooting
Medalists at the 2020 Summer Olympics
20th-century American people
21st-century American people